XEG may refer to:
Xyloglucan-specific endo-beta-1,4-glucanase, an enzyme
XEG-AM, a Guadalupe, Mexico, radio station
 XEG, IATA Code of Kingston, Ontario Railway Station